The discography of Myname, a South Korean idol group, consists of six studio albums, one compilation album, two mini-albums, four single albums, 19 singles, and two video albums released in South Korea and Japan.

Albums

Studio albums

Compilation albums

Extended plays

Single albums

Singles

Video albums

Soundtrack appearances

Notes

References

Discographies of South Korean artists
K-pop music group discographies